Stadion Mirko Vučurević is a football stadium in Banatski Dvor, Serbia.

History
The stadium was named after Serbian-Swiss businessman Mirko Vučurević, the owner of Budućnost Banatski Dvor, who financed its construction. The opening ceremony was held in September 1998 and the event was attended by many of Vučurević's friends and colleagues, including politicians Mihalj Kertes, Jovica Stanišić and Milorad Vučelić, among others.

References

External links
 Stadion Mirko Vučurević at Soccerway

Mirko Vucurevic
Buildings and structures in Vojvodina